Shabtin is a  Palestinian village in the Ramallah and al-Bireh Governorate in the central West Bank.

Location
Shabtin is bordered by  Al Itihad to the east,  Shuqba  to the north,  Ni'lin   to the west, and  Deir Qaddis  to the south.

History
Just southeast of the village (at grid no. 1544/1528) is Kh. Shabtin, where pottery sherds from the Persian, Persian/Hellenistic, late Roman,  Byzantine Umayyad/Abbasid eras have been found. The SWP noted "Traces of ruins" here.

Pottery sherds from the Roman/Byzantine eras have been found at Shabtin.

During the Crusader era, the area was a Crusader stronghold, centred around Aboud. Remains of a house from Crusader era have been identified in the centre of Shabtin.

Sherds from the Mamluk era have been found in Shabtin, together with a hoard of 45 Mamluk gold coins.

Ottoman era
Sherds from the early Ottoman era has also been found here.

In the 1840s, the village got caught up in the Qays–Yaman rivalry and was at one time plundered.

In 1870, Victor Guérin noted the village, Cheptin, on the slopes of a hill in the distance. An Ottoman village list of the same year, 1870, showed that Schetin had 16 houses and a population of 42, though the population count only included men.

In 1882, the PEF's Survey of Western Palestine (SWP) described ‘’Shebtin’’ as: "a small village in a valley, with a  well to the east. It appears to be an ancient site, and has rock cut tombs south of it."

British Mandate era
In the 1922 census of Palestine, conducted by the British Mandate authorities, Shebtin had a population of 63 inhabitants, all Muslims,   increasing in the 1931 census to a population of 110, still all Muslim, in 20 houses.

In 1945 statistics the population of Shabtin was 150 Muslims, with 4,423 dunams of land, according to an official land and population survey. Of this, 27 dunams were used for plantations and irrigable land, 1,158 dunams for cereals, while 7 dunams were built-up (urban) land.

Jordanian era
In the wake of the 1948 Arab–Israeli War, Shabtin came under Jordanian rule.

The Jordanian census of 1961 found 232 inhabitants.

Post-1967
During the Six-Day War in 1967, Shabtin came under Israeli occupation.

After the 1995 accords, 7.2% of  Shabtin land was classified as Area B, the remaining 92.8% as Area C.

Israel has confiscated 1,781 dunams of land from Shabtin in order to construct two settlements, Nili and Na'aleh.

References

Bibliography

External links
Welcome To Shabtin
Survey of Western Palestine, Map 14:   IAA,  Wikimedia commons  
Shabtin Village (Fact Sheet), Applied Research Institute–Jerusalem (ARIJ)
Shabtin Village Profile, ARIJ
Shabtin photo, ARIJ

Ramallah and al-Bireh Governorate
Villages in the West Bank
Municipalities of the State of Palestine